LegalZoom.com, Inc. is an American online legal technology and services company launched in 2001. It helps its customers create legal documents without necessarily having to hire a lawyer. Available documents include wills and living trusts, business formation documents, copyright registrations, and trademark applications. The company also offers attorney referrals and registered agent services.

Cited as a disruption to traditional consumer legal services, the company asserts that this disruption benefits people who otherwise could not hire a lawyer by expanding their access to legal services.

LegalZoom was founded by Brian S. Lee, Brian Liu, Edward Hartman, and Robert Shapiro.

Reception
Based on concerns that LegalZoom's services were a form of legal advice, the North Carolina State Bar issued a cease and desist order in 2008. After an investigation by a special referee, the court determined that LegalZoom's practices "do not constitute the unauthorized practice of law". Similar lawsuits in other states were settled or dismissed.

The September 2012 issue of Consumer Reports magazine gave mixed reviews to the computer-aided legal forms generated by LegalZoom and two of its competitors, Nolo (formerly Nolo Press) and Rocket Lawyer. The evaluation found that all three companies provided documents "for a fraction of what you'd pay a lawyer." The Consumer Reports review also said that "[u]sing any of the three services is generally better than drafting the documents yourself without legal training or not having them at all. But unless your needs are simple... none of the will-writing products is likely to entirely meet your needs." It also found in some cases, the other non-will documents weren't specific enough or contained language that could potentially lead to an unintended result.

A 2016 analysis posted on the e-commerce blogging site "Blogtrepreneur" examined some of the reviews given to LegalZoom by experts and by its customers. The analysis found that "not all of the LegalZoom reviews have been flattering," but noted that the company is accredited by the Better Business Bureau, that it has been in business since 2001, and called LegalZoom "a fairly noteworthy and respected business."

In 2015, LegalZoom and the North Carolina State Bar Association settled years of litigation by agreeing that companies like LegalZoom which offer automated legal document preparation will not violate North Carolina's prohibitions against the unauthorized practice of law if the companies register with the state and comply with certain consumer protection procedures. Following the settlement, the US Federal Trade Commission and the US Department of Justice jointly advised the North Carolina Legislature that the state should avoid placing overly broad restrictions on companies that offer computer-facilitated legal services. In discussing the potential benefits from such software and websites, the two agencies stated that "[i]nteractive software for generating legal forms may be more cost-effective for some consumers, may exert downward price pressure on licensed lawyer services, and may promote the more efficient and convenient provision of legal services. Such products may also help increase access to legal services."

Achievements and acquisitions 
LegalZoom was a nominee for the American Bar Association's 2005 Louis M. Brown Award. In 2011, Business Insider ranked LegalZoom 27th on its list of the world's most valuable startups, and in 2012, Fast Company ranked LegalZoom 26th on its list of the most innovative companies.

In September 2012, LegalZoom formed a partnership with the United Kingdom-based legal services provider QualitySolicitors, as part of which the companies jointly offer online legal services in the United Kingdom including company formations and divorce documents.

On January 6, 2014, European private capital firm Permira announced its intent to acquire $200 million in the outstanding equity of LegalZoom and become its largest shareholder pending regulatory approval. On February 14, 2014 Permira announced that the deal was complete.

In 2015, LegalZoom announced they were to make their first UK acquisition. The acquired firm was Beaumont Legal, a 200-year-old firm in Wakefield, West Yorkshire, England which describes itself as one of the largest conveyancers in the country.

In 2021, LegalZoom acquired Earth Class Mail.

In 2022, LegalZoom acquired Revv, an India based document automation and form template company.

References

External links 

Companies based in Glendale, California
Law firms established in 2001
Internet properties established in 2001
2001 establishments in California
Online legal services
Companies listed on the Nasdaq
2021 initial public offerings
American companies established in 2001
Online companies of the United States
Legal organizations based in the United States